The Victims of Crime Act of 1984 (VOCA) is United States federal government legislation aimed at helping the victims of crime through means other than punishment of the criminal. It established the Crime Victim's Fund, a scheme to compensate victims of crime.

Crime victim's fund 
The  Office for Victims of Crime, established by the Victims of Crime Act (VOCA) of 1984, administers the Crime Victims Fund. The fund is financed by fines paid by convicted federal offenders. As of September 2013, the Fund balance had reached almost $9 billion. Revenues deposited into the Fund also come from gifts, donations, and bequests by private parties, as provided by an amendment to VOCA through the Patriot Act that went into effect in 2002. From 2002 – 2013, over $300,000 has been deposited into the Fund through this provision.

See also
 Office for Victims of Crime

References

External links 
Victims of Crime Act of 1984 As Amended: A Report to the President & the Congress

United States federal criminal legislation
1984 in American law
Compensation for victims of crime